Isabel La Católica is a  metro station on the Mexico City Metro. It is located in the Colonia Centro neighborhood in the Cuauhtémoc borough in Mexico City's downtown. The station closed on 9 July 2022 for modernization work on the tunnel and the line's technical equipment.

General information
Its logo represents one of Christopher Columbus's three caravels. Its name comes from nearby Avenida Isabel La Católica, named after Queen Isabel of Castile, who helped Columbus finance his journeys to the Americas.  The station was opened on 5 September 1969.

Ridership

Nearby
University of the Cloister of Sor Juana, private university located in the former San Jerónimo Convent.
Museo de Charrería, museum dedicated to the sport and tradition of the charreada.

Exits
North: Avenida José María Izazaga and Isabel la Católica, Centro
South: Avenida José María Izazaga and Isabel la Católica, Centro

References

External links 
 

Isabel la Catolica
Railway stations opened in 1969
1969 establishments in Mexico
Mexico City Metro stations in Cuauhtémoc, Mexico City
Accessible Mexico City Metro stations